The 2022 Big West Conference women's basketball tournament was the postseason women's basketball tournament for the Big West Conference of the 2021–22 NCAA Division I women's basketball season. It was held March 8–12, 2022, at the Dollar Loan Center in Henderson, Nevada. The winner received the conference's automatic bid to the 2022 NCAA tournament.

Hawaii won its third title, and its second since rejoining the Big West, for their seventh NCAA Tournament appearance.

Seeds
Of the 11 conference teams, 10 are eligible for the tournament. UC San Diego remains ineligible for the Big West tournament, as they are in the second year of the four-year transition required for teams transferring to Division I from Division II, despite their games counting in the standings, unlike their men’s counterparts. 

For this year only, teams were seeded by winning percentage within the conference due to unpredictabilities with COVID-19, with normal additional tiebreakers in place, if necessary. Unlike previous years until 2020, reseeding teams after the quarterfinals does not take place.

Schedule and results

Bracket

References

Big West Conference women's basketball tournament
Tournament
Big West Conference women's basketball tournament
Big West Conference women's basketball tournament
Sports competitions in Henderson, Nevada
Basketball competitions in the Las Vegas Valley
Women's sports in Nevada
College basketball tournaments in Nevada
College sports tournaments in Nevada